We're Goin' Up is an album by saxophonist Eric Kloss which was recorded in 1968 and released on the Prestige label.

Reception

Allmusic awarded the album 3 stars.

Track listing 
 "Get the Money Bluze" - 2:33   
 "I Long to Belong to You" - 6:48   
 "Gentle Is My Lover" - 7:51   
 "We´re Goin' Up" - 5:34   
 "Of Wine and You" - 6:06   
 "Blues Up Tight" - 5:53

Personnel 
Eric Kloss - alto saxophone, tenor saxophone
Jimmy Owens - trumpet, Flugelhorn
Kenny Barron - piano
Bob Cranshaw - bass
Alan Dawson  - drums

References 

1968 albums
Eric Kloss albums
Prestige Records albums
Albums produced by Don Schlitten